Abraham bar Hillel was an Egyptian Hebrew-language poet whose works were discovered in 1896 in the Cairo Geniza. He wrote the Megillah Zutta ('The Scroll of Zuta') in elegant rimed prose, narrating the downfall of a contemporary Egyptian Jewish leader. As a prologue and an epilogue, he added poems which show their author to have been a skilful versifier. This work was completed in 1176.

References
 

12th-century Egyptian people
12th-century Jews
12th-century poets
Medieval Egyptian Jews